Erik Bergström Frisk (born 28 September 1999) is a Swedish cyclist, who currently rides for UCI Continental team . His brother Hannes is also a cyclist.

Major results

2016
 3rd Road race, National Junior Road Championships
2017
 National Junior Road Championships
3rd Road race
3rd Time trial
2019
 National Under–23 Road Championships
1st  Road race
1st  Time trial
 National Under–23 Road Championships
2nd Time trial
3rd Road race
 4th Overall Tour of Qinghai Lake
 10th Kalmar Grand Prix
 10th Scandinavian Race Uppsala
2020
 1st  Young rider classification, Sibiu Cycling Tour
 6th Overall Tour of Romania

References

External links

1999 births
Living people
Swedish male cyclists
Sportspeople from Stockholm